Aux Sable Township (T34N R8E) is one of seventeen townships in Grundy County, Illinois, USA.  As of the 2010 census, its population was 13,061 and it contained 4,433 housing units.

Geography

Cities, towns, villages
 Channahon (west half)
 Minooka (southwest three-quarters)

Unincorporated towns
 Aux Sable at 
 Sand Ridge at 
(This list is based on USGS data and may include former settlements.)

Cemeteries
The township contains these three cemeteries: Aux Sable, Dresden and Saint Marys.

Major highways
  Interstate 80
  U.S. Route 6

Airports and landing strips
 Three Rivers Farm Airport

Rivers
 Des Plaines River

Landmarks
 Il Dept Of Transportation-Rest Area

Demographics

School districts
Minooka Community Consolidated School District 201
Minooka Community High School District 111

Political districts
 Illinois's 11th congressional district
 State House District 75
 State Senate District 38

References
 
 United States Census Bureau 2007 TIGER/Line Shapefiles
 United States National Atlas

External links
 City-Data.com
 Illinois State Archives

Townships in Grundy County, Illinois
Townships in Illinois
1849 establishments in Illinois